Bumping may refer to:

Processes
 Bumping (chemistry), the irregular boiling of a liquid
 Lock bumping, a lock picking technique
 Thread bumping on an Internet forum

Places
 Bumping Lake, Washington state, United States
 Bumping River, which flows into Bumping Lake

See also
 Bump (disambiguation)